S. Ravi may refer to:

 Sundaram Ravi (born 1966), cricket umpire
 S. Ravi (politician), member of the Tamil Nadu Legislative Assembly
 Shambulingaiah Ravi (born 1967), member of Karnataka Legislative Council